The 1988–89 Creighton Bluejays men's basketball team represented Creighton University during the 1988–89 NCAA Division I men's basketball season. The Bluejays, led by head coach Tony Barone, played their home games at the Omaha Civic Auditorium. The Jays finished with a 20–11 record (11–3 MVC), and won the Missouri Valley Conference tournament to earn an automatic bid to the 1989 NCAA tournament.

Roster

Schedule and results
 
|-
!colspan=9| Regular season

|-
!colspan=9| Missouri Valley Conference tournament

|-
!colspan=9| 1989 NCAA tournament

References

Creighton
Creighton
Creighton Bluejays men's basketball seasons
Creighton Bluejays men's bask
Creighton Bluejays men's bask